Galatia was the name of a province of the Roman Empire in Anatolia (modern central Turkey). It was established by the first emperor, Augustus (sole rule 30 BC – 14 AD), in 25 BC, covering most of formerly independent Celtic Galatia, with its capital at Ancyra.

Under the Tetrarchy reforms of Diocletian, its northern and southern parts were split to form the southern part of the province of Paphlagonia and the province of Lycaonia, respectively.

In c. 398 AD, during the reign of Arcadius, it was divided into the provinces of Galatia Prima and Galatia Secunda or Salutaris. Galatia Prima covered the northeastern part of the old province, retaining Ancyra as its capital and was headed by a consularis. Salutaris comprised the southwestern half of the old province and was headed by a praeses, with its seat at Pessinus. Both provinces were part of the Diocese of Pontus. The provinces were briefly reunited in 536–548 under Justinian I. Although the area was eventually incorporated in the new thema of Anatolikon in the latter half of the 7th century, traces of the old provincial administration survived until the early 8th century.

Governors 

(List based on Bernard Rémy, Les carrières sénatoriales dans les provinces romaines d'Anatolie au Haut-Empire (31 av. J.-C. - 284 ap. J.-C.) (Istanbul: Institut Français d'Études Anatoliennes-Georges Dumézil, 1989).)

 First organization of the province of Galatia
 Marcus Lollius 25 - 22 BC
 Lucius Calpurnius Piso Pontifex 14 - 13 BC
 Cornutus Aquila 6 BC
 Publius Sulpicius Quirinius 5 - 3 BC
 Marcus Servilius Nonianus AD 3
 Marcus Plautius Silvanus 6 - 7
 Sextus Sotidius Strabo Libuscidianus 13 - 16
 Priscus c. 16 - 20 or 21
 Metilius c. 20 - 25 or 21 - 26
 Fronto c. 25 - 29 or 26 - 30
 Silvanus c. 29 - 33 or 30 - 34
 Titus Helvius Basila c. 33 to c. 37
 Marcus Annius Afrinus 49 – 54
 Quintus Petronius Umbrinus 54 - 55
 Lucius Nonius Calpurnius Torquatus Asprenas 68 - 70

(Between AD 70 and AD 111 Galatia was combined with Cappadocia. The governors for those years can be found at List of Roman governors of Cappadocia.)

 Second organization of the province of Galatia 
 Lucius Caesennius Sospes 111 - 114
 Gaius Julius Quadratus Bassus c. 114
 Lucius Catilius Severus 114 - 117?
 Lucius Cossonius Gallus 117 - 119
 Aulus Larcius Macedo 119 - 122
 Gaius Trebius Sergianus c. 127 - 130
 Julius Saturninus c. 130 - 136
 Gaius Julius Scapula c. 136 - 139
 Lucius Fulvius Rusticus Aemilianus Between 131 and 161
 Cornelius [Dex]ter c. 156 - 159 or 157 - 160
 Publius Juventius Celsus 161–163
 Lucius Fufidius Pollio 163 - 165
 Titus Licinnius Mucianus c. 175 - 177
 Lucius Saevinius Proculus c. 177 - 180
 Lucius Fabius Cilo c. 190 - 197
 [...] Valerianus [...]ninus c. 194 - 197
 Lucius Petronius Verus 197/198
 Gaius Atticus Norbanus Strabo 198-c. 201
 Publius Caecilius Urbicus Aemilianus c. 205 - 208
 Publius Alfius Maximus c. 183 - 185 or 213 - 215
 Lucius Egnatius Victor Lollianus c. 215 - 218
 Publius Plotius Romanus c. 218 - 221
 Lucius Julius Apronius Maenius Pius Salamallianus c. 221 - 224
 Quintus Aradius Rufinus Optatus Aelianus c. 224 - 227
 Quintus Servaeus Fuscus Cornelianus c. 229 - 230
 Marcus Domitius Valerianus c. 230 - 232
 Aurelius Basileus c. 227 - 229 or 232 - 235
 Marcus Junius Valerius Nepotianus 250
 Minicius Florentius After 250

Ecclesiastical administration
According to the canons of the Council of Chalcedon (451) and the Synecdemus of Hierocles (c. 531), the province of Galatia Prima had Ancyra as its metropolitan see, with six suffragan sees: Tavium, Aspona, Kinna, Lagania or Anastasiopolis, Mnizos and Juliopolis.

According to the canons of the Council of Chalcedon and the Synecdemus, the province of Galatia Secunda had Pessinus as its metropolitan see, with eight suffragan sees: Orkistos, Petinessos, Amorium, Klaneos (absent in Chalcedon), Troknades, Eudoxias, Myrika and Germa or Myriangelon. Pessinus sank into decay when Justinianopolis was founded in the mid-6th century and eventually the metropolitan see was transferred there, while retaining his title.

References

Sources

 
 

 
States and territories established in the 1st century BC
Provinces of the Byzantine Empire
Provinces of the Roman Empire
Roman provinces in Anatolia
25 BC establishments

bg:Галатия